A Mediterranean Port or A Sea Port by Moonlight refers to two 1771 paintings of the same subject by the French painter Claude Joseph Vernet. They are now in the Museo Soumaya in Mexico City and the Louvre in Paris.

The two paintings form part of a series of fifteen works by Vernet showing port scenes. It was commissioned by Madame du Barry, who was trying to replace Madame de Pompadour as the greatest art patron among Louis XIV's lovers. Vernet was one of a circle of artists which gathered around du Barry. The paintings were intended for a pavilion at the Chateau de Louveciennes. They resemble the same painter's Night: Mediterranean Coastal Scene with Fishermen and Boats (1753).

References

Paintings in the collection of the Museo Soumaya
Paintings in the Louvre by French artists
1771 paintings
Maritime paintings
Moon in art
Paintings by Claude-Joseph Vernet